Tadashi Ogasahara (born 12 September 1969) is a Japanese football manager who currently manages WE League club AC Nagano Parceiro Ladies.

References 

Living people
1969 births
Japanese women's football managers
Association football people from Kyoto Prefecture